Stars in Shadow is a turn-based, 4X science-fiction computer strategy game developed by Ashdar Games and published by Iceberg Interactive for Windows PC in 2017.

Premise 
Stars in Shadow is set in a galaxy which suffered from a grand-scale war between many civilizations and alien races, the so-called 'Great War'. Before the Great War the galaxy enjoyed a golden age, but the Great War ended this period of prosperity. Three thousand years later, the galaxy is currently in the progress of rebuilding.

Gameplay 
In Stars in Shadow you can play as one of seven factions. The factions consists of humans and six alien races: the Phidi, Orthin, Yoral, Ashdar and the Gremak. The goal of the game is to "explore the galaxy, rediscover and colonize distant worlds, and build an interstellar empire". Players also engage in turn-based fleet combat, a core mechanic.

The 'Legacies' DLC adds an eighth playable faction, the Tinkers.

Development 
Stars in Shadow was developed by Ashdar Games, a small studio consisting of programmer Sven Olsen and artist Jim Francis. Francis is responsible for the game's comic book art style. He is also known as the author and artist of the full-color web-based science fiction comic “Outsider”. In an interview with GameStar, Olsen named Master of Orion 2 as his main inspiration for the game.

The game went in Early Access in September 2016. IndieGames.com noted its style as "being probably its most striking element." PC Gamer reviewed the game when it entered Early Access and made note of the diversity of its playable races and the space combat gameplay, but reviewer T.J. Hafer stated that it was too early to tell if the "will soar above the clouds and become a respected peer in the space 4X renaissance."

Stars in Shadow left Early Access in January 2017, with Forbes' Erik Kain comparing its art style to Master of Orion. Logan Booker of Kotaku Australia also compared the look of the game to Master of Orion and to Star Control.

In August 2017 a DLC called 'Legacies' was announced. Stars in Shadow: Legacies adds a new faction called the Tinkers, bringing the number of playable alien races from six to seven. Originally slated for a September 2017 release date, the DLC was moved to October 2017. According to the developer, this was done "to release a DLC that meets your expectations (and our own)". The Legacies DLC was released on October 19, 2017.

Reception 
Stars in Shadow received a positive reception from press. The game currently holds a 75 metascore on Metacritic. Tom Chick of Quarter to Three reviewed the game with four out of five stars, praising its ability to focus on the most important aspects of 4X games. WCCFTech praised the game for its art style and "outstanding turn-based tactics in ship battles", but noticed the lack of an in-depth story. Hooked Gamers also praised the turn-based combat and its depth. Overpowered Noobs noted that the game is perfect for novices to the 4X genre.

References

External links 
 Stars in Shadow Official Website
 Iceberg Interactive Official Website

2017 video games
4X video games
Early access video games
Iceberg Interactive games
Space opera video games
Turn-based strategy video games
Video games about extraterrestrial life
Windows games